Fattitude is a 2017 American documentary film by Lindsey Averill and Viridiana Lieberman.

Summary
The movie is about fat discrimination and its main objective is to make the general public more aware of the prejudice that fat people experience. The movie promotes the fat acceptance movement—a social movement that seeks to change anti-fat bias in social attitudes.

The documentary informs people about what the filmmakers call fat shaming and fat hatred. The documentary also  hopes to inspire people to speak out about the prejudice they face or the mistreatment of others.

Production
The film was financed by running a successful crowdfunding campaign at the website Kickstarter in which 1,073 backers pledged $44,140 to help bring this project to life.

Controversy
After start the Kickstarter campaign, Averill and Lieberman became the target of heavy trolling and harassment from anonymous users on 4chan and other web forums, and received rape and death threats. People ordered pizzas delivered to Averill's home, and they were forced to change their phone numbers due to the number of hateful calls.

References

External links 
 
 

American documentary films
2017 films
2017 documentary films
2010s English-language films
2010s American films